"Take This Heart" is a song by American singer Richard Marx, released as the third single from his third studio album, Rush Street (1991). It peaked at number 20 on the US Billboard Hot 100 while reaching number four on the Billboard Adult Contemporary chart. The song additionally reached the top 20 in Australia and the United Kingdom and peaked at number four in Canada.

Music video
In the video, Richard Marx is seen playing for the Chicago Cubs against the Oakland A's, in the seventh game of the World Series (Marx was born in Chicago and is a noted Cubs fan). In the classic baseball clutch situation, ninth inning with two outs, he is called in to pinch-hit against A's star relief pitcher Dennis Eckersley (a close friend of Marx and former Cubs pitcher). The baseball scenes, with commentary by announcer Bob Uecker, are intercut with footage of Marx and his band playing the song on the field of the A's ballpark, the Oakland Coliseum.

With two strikes against him, Marx hits a home run to win the game for Chicago, to the dismay of Oakland players Rickey Henderson and Jose Canseco. The scene then cuts to a dozing Marx being shaken awake backstage just before a concert, having dreamed the championship game. As he prepares to start the show, Uecker's cry of "The Cubs have won the World Series!" echoes in his head. 

Since the game was played in Oakland, the A's (as the home team) would still bat in the bottom of the ninth, so Marx' homer could not have guaranteed a win for the Cubs. In addition, both teams are wearing their home uniforms. Eckersley, Henderson, Canseco, and Uecker appear as themselves, as does Cubs manager Jim Lefebvre and A's manager Tony LaRussa.

Track listings

US and Australian cassette single
 "Take This Heart" – 4:10
 "I Get No Sleep" – 3:44

European CD single
 "Take This Heart" – 4:10
 "I Get No Sleep" – 3:44
 "Right Here Waiting" (live) – 4:56

UK 7-inch single
A. "Take This Heart"
B. "Hazard"

UK CD1
 "Take This Heart"
 "Take It to the Limit" (live)
 "That Was Lulu" (live)
 "Rhythm of Life" (live)

UK CD2
 "Take This Heart"
 "Hazard"
 "Love Unemotional"
 "Ride with the Idol"

Personnel
 Richard Marx – vocals 
 Michael Egizi – keyboards 
 Michael Landau – guitars, guitar solo 
 Nathan East – bass 
 Jonathan Moffett – drums
 Chris Trujillo – percussion

Charts

Weekly charts

Year-end charts

Release history

References

1991 songs
1992 singles
Capitol Records singles
Richard Marx songs
Songs written by Richard Marx